El Bar Provoca was a reality show consisting on a real bar (actually it's a nightclub) being attended by 13 people, watched 24 hours, while they live in El Depa (The Apartment). It was hosted through the first month by Roberto Palazuelos as El Patrón (The Boss). Then it was host by Roxana Castellanos as La Patrona (The Patroness). Other hosts are Karla Gómez and Elías Chiprut (The Access Bar) and Lorena Herrera as La Dama de la Noche (The Lady of the Night). The show has ended.

Season 1
The first and only season of El Bar Provoca premiered on August 2, 2006. Through the first month, Roberto Palazuelos was the main host of the show. After this month, the main host was changed due to conflicts inside Televisa. The new hosts are Roxana Castellanos and Lorena Herrera.

Los Socios
Los Socios (The Partners) is a group of two people that will judge the participants according to their work done. They are Mario Beteta and Jorge Mondragón. The main partner is Enrique Rocha, an actor who entered the show after the change of hosts.

Los Consejeros
Los Consejeros (The Counselors) is a group of four people that will give opinions to help El Patrón to decide about many different things that happen during the show. They are Erich Zinser, Eduardo Cesarmann, Jorge Ramos and Simón Charaf.

Contestants

Nominations

External links
 Official website

Mexican reality television series
2006 Mexican television series debuts
2006 Mexican television series endings